The Ravens–Titans rivalry is a professional American football rivalry between the Baltimore Ravens and the Tennessee Titans in the National Football League’s American Football Conference. Originally divisional rivals in the AFC Central, the Ravens and Titans eventually moved into the AFC North and AFC South respectively. However, despite moving into separate divisions, this didn't stop the strong enmity that the two teams had for each other during the 2000s. The teams have met in the playoffs five times and are both known for their strong defensive play. The rivalry is one of the tightest in the NFL with a 13–13 series record. In 2020, CBS ranked it as the No. 7 NFL rivalry of the 2000s.

History 
The rivalry between the Baltimore Ravens and the then-Houston Oilers began with the in  when the Ravens were founded as a result of the Cleveland Browns' relocation to Baltimore and subsequent deactivation.  The Ravens assumed Cleveland's place in the AFC Central, in which the Oilers were also a member.  As divisional rivals, the Ravens played the Oilers/Titans twice a year from 1996 through , which encompassed the Oilers'  move to Tennessee and  name change from "Oilers" to "Titans."  The teams met 13 times during these years, including once in the playoffs: a 24–10 Ravens win in the 2000 Divisional Round.

The Ravens were placed in the AFC North while the Titans were placed in the AFC South. As a result, the two teams would only meet sporadically from this point on. The Ravens and Titans would meet in the regular season at least once every three years when the AFC North plays the AFC South in the schedule rotation.

Throughout the history of the rivalry, the teams have met in the playoffs five times, with the Ravens leading 3–2. The away team has won every playoff meeting.  The Titans were twice upset by the Ravens as the AFC's top seed (in 2000 and 2008), while the Titans upset the top-seeded Ravens in 2019.

Notable moments
The two teams had their first meeting at the Astrodome on September 15, during the Ravens' first season and the Oilers' final year in Houston. The two teams met in the playoffs for the first time on January 7, 2001. Ravens linebacker Ray Lewis intercepted a pass bobbled by Titans running back Eddie George for a fourth quarter touchdown, sealing a 24–10 Baltimore win that helped the Ravens advance to winning their first Super Bowl in franchise history.

On January 4, 2004, during the 2003 Wild Card Round, the Titans got revenge for their last postseason loss. While Titans quarterback Steve McNair and Ravens quarterback Anthony Wright combined for two touchdowns (49 yards to Justin McCareins and 35 yards to Todd Heap) and five interceptions, McNair led Tennessee down the field following Wright’s score to Heap, setting up their game-winning field goal. This 20–17 win also snapped a five-game losing streak to the Ravens.

In 2006, the Titans traded Steve McNair to the Ravens after locking him out of their facility during a contract dispute.

On January 10, 2009, in the 2008 Divisional Round, the Ravens defeated the top-seeded Titans with a 13–10 victory after the Titans committed three costly turnovers, two by quarterback Kerry Collins. The Ravens won behind rookie quarterback Joe Flacco and former Titans Samari Rolle and Derrick Mason.

 On January 11, 2020, in the 2019 Divisional Round, the 6th-seeded Titans avenged their prior playoff losses to the Ravens as the AFC's 1st seed, upsetting the top-seeded Ravens 28–12 in the divisional round behind strong performances from running back Derrick Henry, quarterback Ryan Tannehill, and the defense, which largely shut down NFL MVP Lamar Jackson.

On November 22, 2020, Derrick Henry scored a 29-yard rushing touchdown in overtime to give the Titans a 30–24 win. Prior to the game, a confrontation ensued after Titans cornerback Malcolm Butler and his teammates taunted the Ravens by yelling at their sideline from midfield. 

On January 10, 2021, the Ravens beat the Titans in Nissan Stadium in the AFC Wild Card 20–13, ending a 2-game losing streak to the Titans, and continuing the trend of the road playoff team winning in this rivalry. After a game-sealing interception by cornerback Marcus Peters, the Ravens danced on the Titans logo at midfield, in retaliation for the Titans dancing on their logo earlier in the season.

Game results

|-
| 
| style="| Oilers 2–0
| style="| Oilers  24–21
| style="| Oilers  29–13
| Oilers  2–0
| Ravens' inaugural season. Rivalry begins as both teams are members of the AFC Central. Only season in the rivalry the Titans franchise was still in Houston. 
|-
| 
| style="| Ravens 2–0
| style="| Ravens  21–19
| style="| Ravens  36–10
| Tie  2–2
| Oilers' first season in Tennessee.
|-
| 
| style="| Oilers 2–0
| style="| Oilers  12–8
| style="| Oilers  16–14
| Oilers  4–2
| Meeting in Baltimore was the first meeting at M&T Bank Stadium. Last season the Titans franchise was named the Oilers.
|-
| 
| Tie 1–1
| style="| Ravens  41–14
| style="| Titans  14–11
| Titans  5–3
| Meeting in Tennessee was the first meeting at Nissan Stadium. Titans lose Super Bowl XXXIV.
|-

|-
| rowspan="2"|
| style="| Titans  14–6
| PSINet Stadium
| rowspan="2"| Titans  6–4
| 
|-
| style="| Ravens  24–23
| Adelphia Coliseum
| Ravens hand Titans their first loss in Adelphia Coliseum as well as their only regular season home loss.
|- style="background:#f2f2f2; font-weight:bold;"
|  2000 Playoffs
|  style="| Ravens  24–10
|  Adelphia Coliseum
|  Titans  6–5
|  AFC Divisional Round. Both of the Titans' home losses on the season were at the hands of the Ravens. Only postseason meeting as AFC Central rivals. The Ravens broke a 10–10 tie in the fourth quarter on a 90-yard blocked FG return and a 50-yard INT return. Ravens win Super Bowl XXXV.
|-
| rowspan="2"|
| style="| Ravens  26–7
| PSINet Stadium
| rowspan="2"| Ravens  7–6
| 
|-
| style="| Ravens  16–10
| Adelphia Coliseum
| Last meeting as AFC Central rivals. Ravens take their first lead in the series of the rivalry.
|-
| 
| style="| Ravens  13–12
| Ravens Stadium
| Ravens  8–6
| Ravens stay in the newly named AFC North, while the Titans are moved into the newly created AFC South.
|- style="background:#f2f2f2; font-weight:bold;"
|  2003 Playoffs
|  style="| Titans  20–17
|  M&T Bank Stadium
|  Ravens  8–7
|  AFC Wild Card Round. Gary Anderson kicks the game-winning field goal with 29 seconds remaining as the Titans advance. 
|-
| 
| style="| Titans  25–10
| The Coliseum
| Tie  8–8
|
|-
| 
| style="| Ravens  27–26
| LP Field
| Ravens  9–8
| Steve McNair’s only game against his former team. 
|-
| 
| style="| Titans  13–10
| M&T Bank Stadium
| Tie  9–9
| 
|- style="background:#f2f2f2; font-weight:bold;"
|  2008 Playoffs
|  style="| Ravens  13–10
|  LP Field
|  Ravens  10–9
| AFC Divisional Round. Matt Stover kicks the game-winning field goal with 57 seconds remaining as the Ravens advance. Ravens' QB Joe Flacco becomes first rookie quarterback to win two playoff games. Titans get upset as the #1 seed in the Divisional Round for the second time at the hands of the Ravens.
|-

|-
| 
| style="| Titans  26–13
| LP Field
| Tie  10–10
| 
|-
| 
| style="| Ravens  21–7
| M&T Bank Stadium
| Ravens  11–10
| 
|-
| 
| style="| Titans  23–20
| Nissan Stadium
| Tie  11–11
| 
|-
| 
| style="| Ravens  21–0
| Nissan Stadium
| Ravens  12–11
| 
|- style="background:#f2f2f2; font-weight:bold;"
| 2019 Playoffs
| style=""| Titans  28–12
| M&T Bank Stadium
| Tie  12–12
| AFC Divisional Round. Titans avenge previous playoff losses to the Ravens as the #1 seed by dominating the 14–2 Ravens and halting their 12-game winning streak. First time in NFL history that the away team wins the first four meetings in any postseason matchup between two franchises. Also marks the third time that the #1 seed is eliminated in the Divisional Round in the rivalry (2000, 2008, 2019), and the first time following that criterion that the Titans beat the Ravens.
|-

|-
| 
| style="| Titans  
| M&T Bank Stadium
| Titans  13–12
| Referees had to break up a pregame argument between Ravens head coach John Harbaugh and Titans CB Malcolm Butler. Titans rally from a 21–10 deficit midway through the third quarter. First overtime meeting in the rivalry.
|- style="background:#f2f2f2; font-weight:bold;"
| 2020 Playoffs
| style="| Ravens  20–13
| Nissan Stadium
| Tie  13–13
| AFC Wild Card Round. Ravens overcome early 10–0 deficit to avenge their playoff loss to the Titans the previous season. Away team has won all five postseason meetings to date.
|-
| 
| 
| Nissan Stadium
|
|
|-

|-
| Regular Season
| style="|
| Tie 5–5
| Titans 6–5
| 
|-
| Postseason games
| style="|
| Titans 2–0
| Ravens 3–0
| AFC Wild Card playoffs: 2003, 2020. AFC Divisional playoffs: 2000, 2008, 2019.
|-
| Regular and postseason 
| Tie 13–13
| Titans 7–5
| Ravens 8–6
| 
|-

Notes

See also 
Texans–Titans rivalry 
Ravens–Steelers rivalry 
Steelers–Titans rivalry

References

External links
Baltimore Ravens vs. Tennessee Titans head-to-head results

 
 

Baltimore Ravens
Tennessee Titans
National Football League rivalries
Tennessee Titans rivalries
Baltimore Ravens rivalries